Manuel Valera (born October 17, 1980) is a Cuban pianist and composer.

Graduated from South Broward High School, Hollywood, FL

Biography
Valera was born in Havana, Cuba. Since 2000 he has lived in New York City, where he attended New School University. His playing is influenced by Bill Evans, Chick Corea and Keith Jarrett, and he has worked extensively in the groups of Dafnis Prieto, Arturo Sandoval, Paquito D'Rivera, Brian Lynch, Yosvany Terry, Jeff "Tain" Watts and Lenny White.

Recordings
Valera's first CD as a leader Forma Nueva was released in 2004. It features bassist John Patitucci, drummers Bill Stewart and Horacio "El Negro" Hernandez and saxophonist Seamus Blake. Historia, Melancolia and Vientos were released between 2005–2007, featuring drummers Antonio Sanchez and Ernesto Simpson, saxophonist Seamus Blake and Joel Frahm, bassists Ben Street and James Genus and percussionist Luis Quintero. 2009 marked the release of Currents, a trio recording with Genus and Simpson and it was also Valera's debut on the Maxjazz label.

After a hiatus as a leader, to focus on sideman work, in 2012 Valera released New Cuban Express with Yosvany Terry on saxophone, John Benitez on bass, Tom Guarna on guitar, Eric Doob on drums, and percussionist Mauricio Herrera.This recording earned him a nomination for a 2013 Grammy Award in the category "Best Latin Jazz Album".

As leader
 Forma Nueva (2004, Mavo) with John Patitucci, Bill Stewart, Horacio "El Negro" Hernandez & Seamus Blake
 Historia (2005, Fresh Sound) with Ben Street, Antonio Sanchez & Seamus Blake
 Melancolia (2006, Mavo) with Ben Street, Antonio Sanchez, Seamus Blake, Luis Quintero
 Vientos (2007, Anzic Records) with James Genus, Ernesto Simpson, Joel Frahm
 Currents (2009, Maxjazz) with James Genus & Ernesto Simpson
 New Cuban Express (2012, Mavo) with Yosvany Terry, Tom Guarna, John Benitez, Eric Doob & Mauricio Herrera
 Expectativas (2013, CD Baby) with Yosvany Terry, Tom Guarna, John Benitez, Paulo Stagnaro & Ludwig Afonso
 Self Portrait (2014, CD Baby)
 In Motion (2014, Criss Cross Jazz) with Yosvany Terry, Tom Guarna, Alex Sipiagin Hans Glawischnig, Mauricio Herrera and Ludwig Afonso
 Live at Firehouse 12 (2015, CD Baby) with E.J. Strickland and Hans Glawischnig
 Urban Landscapes (2015, Destiny Records) with Groove Square
 The Seasons (2017, Mavo Records) with E.J. Strickland and Hans Glawischnig
 The Planets (2018, Mavo Records) with E.J. Strickland and Hans Glawischnig

Selected discography as a sideman
with Dafnis Prieto – The Sooner The Better
with Dafnis Prieto – Si o Si Quartet Live at the Jazz Standard
with Brain Lynch – Conclave, Vol. 2
with John Benitez – Purpose
with Oscar Feldman – Oscar E Familia
with Samuel Torres – Yaounde
with Dana Lauren – It's You or No One

Awards
 Finalist in the 2004 and 2006 Great American Jazz Competition
 Recipient of the 2005 and 2006 ASCAP Young Composers Award
 Final nominee in the Up & Coming Musician of the Year category of the Jazz Journalists Association Awards.
 Received a commission for the 2007, 2013 and 2017  Chamber Music America New Works Award.
 New Cuban Express nominated for 2013 Grammy, Best Latin Jazz Album of the Year
 2019 Guggenheim Fellowship in musical composition

References

External links
 http://www.allmusic.com/artist/manuel-valera-mn0000128062 http://www.freshsoundrecords.com/historia-cd-4048.html http://www.allaboutjazz.com/php/article.php?id=42465#.UFDHsUI1alI http://www.allaboutjazz.com/php/article.php?id=26029#.UFDHyUI1alI
 https://www.nytimes.com/2006/03/25/arts/music/25manu.html http://www.sunnysiderecords.com/artist.php?id=411
 https://web.archive.org/web/20120922115633/http://jazztimes.com/guides/artists/9699-manuel-valera
 https://www.npr.org/event/music/149577869/manuel-valeras-new-cuban-express-live-at-92y-tribeca
 http://www.miamiherald.com/2012/09/19/3010465/dazzling-cuban-pianist-manuel.html http://www.ascap.com/eventsawards/awards/jazzwall/2004/bios/yj_recipients/valera.aspx https://archive.today/20130118043158/http://afrocubanlatinjazz4.blogspot.com/2010/03/manuel-valera-cuba-2005-192k.html

Cuban composers
Male composers
Cuban jazz pianists
People from Havana
1980 births
Living people
21st-century pianists
Cuban male musicians